Barfold is a locality situated  on the Heathcote-Kyneton Road (C326) in Victoria, Australia. It has a community hall, Barfold Hall, and an Anglican church, Barfold Union Church.

A significant geological feature in the area is the Barfold Gorge, a four kilometre long gorge which is up to 80 metres deep and has two waterfalls,  basalt columns and a lava cave.

A Barfold Post Office opened on 1 November 1861, some distance to the south of the present township. It was renamed Langley in 1867 when a new Barfold office was renamed from Emberton which had been open a few months.  This closed in 1957, as did Langley in 1970

Barfold was the birthplace of William Watt, Premier of Victoria in 1912 and 1913.

The Barfold sign now used on the public hall was originally the railway station sign for Barfold station, which was on the Redesdale railway line. The station closed in 1954.
The history of Barfold started in April 1837 When John Coppock and Edward Eyre (An early Australian explorer) were sent from Yass to Port Phillip to find a suitable Run (sheep and cattle station) for William Henry Yaldwyn and early settler. In July 1837 John Coppock met up with Alexander Mollison on the west bank of the Campaspe River some 65 miles from Melbourne. William Henry Yaldwyn leased from the Crown some 60,000 acres of good grazing land at Barfold for an annual Fee of Ten pounds. Barfold was named by Yaldwyn after Barfold-under-Beacon in Sussex, England, which was part of his Estate there.
William Yaldwyn sold "Barfold" to Thomas Thorneloe a managing partner of a syndicate of John Montagu and Sir George Arthur former Lieutenant Governor of Tasmania before the crash of 1843. "Yaldwyn" is remembered by the people of Kyneton who have named Yaldwyn road after him.(References; Yaldwyn of the Golden Spurs by J.O.Randell published by the Melbourne Mast Gully Press 1980 and An Overlanding Diary of Alexander Fullerton Mollison edited by J.O.Randell and published by the Melbourne Mast Gully Press 1980. The State Library of Victoria.)

References

7. Yaldwyn of the Golden Spurs by J.O.Randell published by The Melbourne Mast Gully Press 1980.
   "An Overlanding Diary" of Alexander Fullerton Mollison by J..Randell published by The Melbourne Mast Gully Press 1980
    The State Library of Victoria

External links

Towns in Victoria (Australia)
1861 establishments in Australia